Foreign relations of Sri Lanka refers to the diplomatic and commercial relations between Sri Lanka and other countries. Sri Lanka has stressed its principle of "friendship towards all, enmity towards none" in its diplomacy.

Sri Lanka since the 1950s has followed a non-aligned foreign policy and does not take sides with major powers. Since the end of the Cold War in Asia, the country has pursued better relations with all major powers and seeks to strengthen its diplomatic, economic and military ties with China, India, Pakistan, Russia, the United States, Japan and the European Union. Sri Lanka has also forged close ties with the member states of the Association of Southeast Asian Nations (ASEAN), African Union and Arab League.

Sri Lanka participates in multilateral diplomacy, particularly at the United Nations, where it seeks to promote sovereignty, independence, and development in the developing world. Sri Lanka was a founding member of the Non-Aligned Movement (NAM). It also is a member of the Commonwealth of Nations, South Asian Association for Regional Cooperation (SAARC), World Bank, International Monetary Fund (IMF), Asian Development Bank (ADB), Shanghai Cooperation Organisation (as dialogue partner) and Colombo Plan. Sri Lanka continues its active participation in the NAM, while also stressing the importance it places on regionalism by playing a strong role in SAARC.

History
The goal of Sri Lanka's foreign policy is to maintain a strong, independent, powerful and unitary Sri Lanka; The Sri Lankan foreign policy establishment maintains that in achieving this goal.

Sri Lanka's foreign policy has been founded in the national interest. In a period of rapid and continuing change, foreign policy capable of responding optimally to new challenges and opportunities. It has to be an integral part of the larger effort of building the nation's capabilities through economic development, strengthening social fabric and well-being of the people and protecting Sri Lanka's sovereignty and territorial integrity. Sri Lanka's foreign policy is a forward-looking engagement with the rest of the world, based on a rigorous, realistic and contemporary assessment of the bilateral, regional and global geo-political and economic milieu.

Military

The Sri Lanka Armed Forces is the overall unified military of Sri Lanka encompassing the Sri Lanka Army, the Sri Lanka Navy, the Sri Lanka Air Force which comes under preview of the Ministry of Defence (Sri Lanka) (MOD). They receive military support from mainly China, Russia, India, Pakistan and Israel. The United States also gives limited support.

Diplomatic relations 
List of countries which Sri Lanka maintains diplomatic relations with (dates are not known for Benin, Bolivia, Democratic Republic of the Congo, Ghana, Guinea, Liberia, Mauritius, Morocco, Somalia, Tunisia, Yemen or Zambia).

Africa

Americas

Asia

Europe

Oceania

Sri Lanka and the Commonwealth of Nations

Sri Lanka has been a member state of the Commonwealth of Nations since 1948, when it became independent as the Dominion of Ceylon.

In 1972, Ceylon became a republic in the Commonwealth of Nations under the name of Sri Lanka.

William Gopallawa, the last Governor-General of Ceylon became the first President of Sri Lanka.

In November 2013, Sri Lanka hosted the Commonwealth Heads of Government Meeting.

See also

 List of diplomatic missions in Sri Lanka
 List of diplomatic missions of Sri Lanka
 Sri Lanka and the Non-Aligned Movement

References

Further reading
 Copper, J. F. "China and Sri-Lanka: Old Friendship Renewed." Asia Quarterly 2 (1975): 101-110.
 Höglund, Kristine, and Isak Svensson. "Mediating between tigers and lions: Norwegian peace diplomacy in Sri Lanka's civil war." Contemporary South Asia 17.2 (2009): 175-191.
 Peebles, Patrick. The History of Sri Lanka (Greenwood, 2005)
 Suryanarayan, V, "Sri Lanka's policy towards China: Legacy of the past and prospects for the future." China Report 30.2 (1994): 203-21

External links
 Ministry of External Affairs of Sri Lanka
 Fallacy and the Reality of IMF Standby Arrangement for Sri Lanka by The Sunday Times

 
Sri Lanka and the Commonwealth of Nations